Charles H. Parsley (October 13, 1925 – October 3, 1997) was a professional basketball player and college coach who spent one season in the National Basketball Association (NBA) as a member of the Philadelphia Warriors (1949–50). He attended Western Kentucky University.

After his playing career, Parsley became a college coach. He was head coach at Southeast Missouri State University and the University of Wisconsin–Milwaukee.

External links
 

1925 births
1997 deaths
American Basketball League (1925–1955) players
American men's basketball coaches
American men's basketball players
Basketball coaches from Kentucky
Basketball players from Kentucky
College men's basketball head coaches in the United States
Milwaukee Panthers men's basketball coaches
People from Paris, Kentucky
Philadelphia Warriors players
Southeast Missouri State Redhawks men's basketball coaches
Western Kentucky Hilltoppers basketball players